The John Gorrie Bridge carries US 98 and US 319 over the Apalachicola Bay. It connects Apalachicola, Florida, with Eastpoint, Florida.  The original John Gorrie Bridge was built in 1935, replacing a ferry service between the two towns.  It included a rotating section to allow passage of ships with high masts.  The current bridge was built in 1988.

Dedication
The Gorrie Bridge Opening Celebration was held on Armistice Day, November 11, 1935. Florida Governor David Sholtz cut the ribbon to officially open what was referred to as the Florida West Coast Scenic Highway.

References

External links
 Frankin County Florida Brochure

Transportation buildings and structures in Franklin County, Florida
Road bridges in Florida
Bridges over the Apalachicola River
U.S. Route 98
Bridges of the United States Numbered Highway System
Apalachicola, Florida
U.S. Route 19
1935 establishments in Florida
Bridges completed in 1935

Bridges completed in 1988